Mieres is a city in Asturias, Spain.

Mieres may also refer to:
Mieres, Girona, village and municipality in Catalonia
Mieres del Camino, a parish in Mieres, Spain

People with the surname
Anthony Mieres, English Protestant leader and exile
Brian Mieres (born 1995), Argentine professional footballer
Gastón Mieres (born 1989), Uruguayan rugby union player
Ignacio Mieres, Argentine rugby union player
Jennifer Mieres, American cardiologist
Malena Mieres (born 2000), Spanish footballer
Pablo Mieres, Uruguayan politician
Roberto Mieres, Argentine racing driver
Rodrigo Mieres (born 1989), Uruguayan professional footballer

See also